WJMR-FM (98.3 MHz) is an urban adult contemporary radio station serving the Milwaukee, Wisconsin, area. They are known on-air as "Jammin' 98.3", and are licensed to Menomonee Falls, Wisconsin.  Under ownership of the Milwaukee Radio Group subsidiary of Saga Communications, its studios (which are shared with the other four sister stations) and transmitter are located in Milwaukee's West Side.

History

98.3 FM history
The 98.3 frequency was home for many years to WZMF, which signed on the air in July 1966. At its inception, the station aired a MOR format. WZMF was located in a small house on Shady Lane in Menomonee Falls.

WZMF's pop music programming eventually became more experimental, and the station evolved into a freeform progressive rock format by October 1968, one of the first stations to do so in the midwest. The station was moderately successful with the format for the next eleven years, pushing rival WTOS into a different format and staying competitive with leading rocker WQFM. When WISN-FM switched from beautiful music to rock as WLPX in January 1978, immediately becoming a ratings success, WZMF began to tighten their format, amid protests from the station's on-air staff, and ratings dropped.

WZMF was sold and went silent on March 23, 1979 after playing its last 3 songs, "Not to Touch the Earth" by The Doors,  "American Pie" by Don McLean, and the National Anthem by Jimi Hendrix. The station returned to the air in May 1979 with an easy listening format as WXJY (Joy FM 98). In 1983, it became home to WFMR and its classical music format.

WJMR-FM history
WJMR started out on 106.9 FM as WMJO, playing a Jammin' Oldies format. Chancellor Broadcasting owned the trademark for the phrase "Jammin' Oldies", so the station was referred to as "Jammin' Hits" and the call letters (which stood for Milwaukee's Jammin' Oldies) were changed to WJMR, and the station was known as "Jammin' 106.9".

The station stayed at 106.9 FM until December 12, 2000, when current owner Saga Communications moved WJMR's format and call letters to 98.3 in a swap with WFMR. This was done primarily to put WJMR's on a signal that more effectively covered the urban areas of Milwaukee, and to target WFMR toward the western and northern suburbs. Soon after WJMR moved to 98.3, the "Jammin' Oldies" trend was winding down, and the station tweaked its format to urban adult contemporary, a format it retains to this day. The station still refers to itself as "Jammin' 98.3", and has had success with its format since moving to the new frequency. The station is a probable rival to WKKV-FM, though the station's focus on an older audience and type of music means their formats rarely clash.

References

External links
Jammin' 98.3 station website
Milwaukee radio: a retrospective
Former WZMF and WFMR studios
A sample playlist from WZMF

Urban adult contemporary radio stations in the United States
JMR-FM